Alex Alexander (28 September 1924 – 14 May 2005) was a Scottish footballer, who played as an outside left for New Brighton and Tranmere Rovers.

References

External links

1924 births
New Brighton A.F.C. players
Tranmere Rovers F.C. players
2005 deaths
Association football wingers
English Football League players
Footballers from Glasgow
Scottish footballers